Vous (Translation: Ox) is a small, uninhabited island 2 kilometres off the East coast of Serifos in the Cyclades, Greece. Its name is evocative of the profile of an ox, which it resembles as seen from Sefiros. The island has a perimeter of approximately 2 kilometres and its greatest length is approximately 570 metres. The island is a popular fishing spot. Administratively, it is part of the municipality of Serifos.

References

Cyclades
Uninhabited islands of Greece
Landforms of Milos (regional unit)
Islands of the South Aegean
Islands of Greece